After World War II, there were many instances of air-to-air combat between the Soviet Union and the United States.

Korean War

During the Korean War formally the air forces did not meet, as the Soviet Union was not a combatant in the conflict. In August 1945 the USSR declared war on Japan and commenced their offensive campaigns against the Japanese Army.  Moving into Japanese occupied Korea, the Soviets gained a foothold in that region, ultimately making it North Korea, and an ally to the Soviet Union.  Nearly 72,000 Soviet personnel served in North Korea and their presence was concealed by both the Soviet and American governments. Following the outbreak of the Korean War, air dogfights between USSR and US pilots were numerous. The Soviets flew planes with Chinese or North Korean markings, and were initially forbidden from speaking Russian over the airwaves. The ban was soon lifted due to obvious problems with using Korean to communicate in critical battle situations.

During the conflict the American F-86 Sabre pilots claimed to have destroyed 792 MiG-15s in air-to-air combat for a loss of 78 Sabres – a phenomenal 10 to 1 kills-to-losses ratio. However, the Soviets claimed to have downed over 600 Sabres. More recent research by Lake Dorr and Warren Thompson has claimed the actual ratio was closer to 2 : 1.  A 2009 RAND review concluded that the actual kill : loss ratio  was 1.8 : 1 overall, and likely closer to 1.3 : 1 against MiGs flown by Soviet pilots.

According to reports by Lt.Gen. Sidor Slyusarev commander of Soviet air forces in Korea, the 64th Corps claimed a total 1,097 enemy aircraft of all types during operations, for the loss of 335 aircraft (including lost to enemy ground fire, accidents, etc) and 110 pilots. This puts the overall kill ratio at 3.4:1 in favor of USSR pilots. Effectiveness of the Soviet fighters declined as the war progressed. While between november 1950 and January 1952 overall kill ratio was 7.9:1 in favor of the USSR, this declined to 2.2:1, during 1952 and 1.9:1 in 1953. This was due in part to more advanced jet fighters appearing on the UN side and improving US tactics.

Vietnam War

Unlike North Korea, Nationalist China invaded French Indochina (Vietnam) in 1945 to regain the region from the occupying Japanese military at the end of World War II, but were unable to gain a foothold in North Vietnam.  Student North Vietnamese MiG pilots were sent to China and the Soviet Union for up to three years for training. Also student North Vietnamese SAM operators were sent to the USSR for about six to nine months of training. Soviet and Chinese Communist pilots were restricted to test flying MiGs which had been exported to North Vietnam from their countries. Due to the urgency brought on by Operation Rolling Thunder, and until North Vietnamese missilemen could be trained, Soviet PVO SAM Anti-Aircraft Missile operator/instructors were quickly deployed to North Vietnam in 1965, and through 1966 were responsible for downing approximately 48 US aircraft during the course of defending North Vietnam. There is one reported ace pilot from the USSR, Col. Vadim Shcherbakov who is credited with 6 air-to-air kills.

Cold War

During the Cold War many nations including the Soviet Union and the United States were fiercely protective of their airspaces. Aircraft which entered an opposing nation's airspace were often shot down in air-to-air combat. The incidents produced a heightened sense of paranoia on both sides that resulted in the downing of civilian craft.  Many of the aircraft listed at that link were not shot down as a result of Cold War paranoia by US or USSR aircrews, but rather direct action by active combatants (for example, the two Air Rhodesia flights).

The table lists air combat losses outside of the war zones, such as Korean War or Vietnam War. It does not include losses to ground-based defenses, and it does not include civilian aircraft.

See also
 Post–World War II air-to-air combat losses
 1958 C-130 shootdown incident
 1960 RB-47 shootdown incident
 1964 T-39 shootdown incident

References

Footnotes

Bibliography

 
 Davies, Peter. F-105 Wild Weasel vs SA-2 "Guideline" SAM, Vietnam 1965–73. Osprey 2011.  .
 Michel III, Marshal L. Clashes, Air Combat Over North Vietnam 1965–1972. Naval Institute Press, 1997.  .
 Toperczer, Istvan. MiG-17 and MiG-19 Units of the Vietnam War. Osprey Combat Aircraft #25.  .
 Toperczer, Istvan. MiG-21 Units of the Vietnam War. Osprey Combat Aircraft #29.  .
 
 
 

Korean War
Military history of the United States during the Korean War
Cold War military history of the Soviet Union
Air-to-air combat operations and battles
Soviet Union–United States relations
Combat incidents
Aircraft shootdown incidents